Jesús Collado Alarcón (born 13 September 1979 in Barcelona) is an S9 swimmer from Spain.

Personal 
Collado was born 13 September 1979 in Barcelona. He is from the Catalan region of Spain.

Swimming 
Collado  is an S9 swimmer. In 2007, he competed at the IDM German Open.  In 2010, Collado raced at the Tenerife International Open. From the Catalan region of Spain, he was a recipient of a 2012 Plan ADO scholarship.

Paralympics 
Collado competed at the 2000 Summer Paralympics, winning a gold medal in the 100 meter butterfly race, and a bronze in the 100 meter backstroke race and in the 200 meter individual medley SM9 race.  He competed at the 2004 Summer Paralympics, winning a gold medal in the 100 meter butterfly race, and a bronze in the 100 meter backstroke race. He competed at the 2008 Summer Paralympics, winning a gold in the 400 meter freestyle race. He raced at the 2012 Summer Paralympics, where he did not medal.

References

External links 
 
 

Spanish male backstroke swimmers
Spanish male butterfly swimmers
Spanish male freestyle swimmers
Spanish male medley swimmers
Living people
1979 births
Paralympic gold medalists for Spain
Paralympic bronze medalists for Spain
Swimmers at the 2000 Summer Paralympics
Swimmers at the 2004 Summer Paralympics
Swimmers at the 2008 Summer Paralympics
Swimmers at the 2012 Summer Paralympics
Swimmers from Barcelona
Paralympic swimmers of Spain
Plan ADOP alumni
Medalists at the 2000 Summer Paralympics
Medalists at the 2004 Summer Paralympics
Medalists at the 2008 Summer Paralympics
Medalists at the World Para Swimming Championships
Paralympic medalists in swimming
S9-classified Paralympic swimmers